State Highway 86 (SH 86) is a state highway in the U.S. state of Texas that runs  from Texico to Estelline. This route was designated on August 21, 1923 as the renumbered SH 5A. On September 17, 1923, the section from Estelline to Turkey was cancelled, as SH 18 extended northeast from Turkey to Memphis. By 1929, it was shortened to Bovina, as it was constructed on that route, instead. It has travelled its present course since then, except for the addition of the northern portion of SH 18 between Turkey and Estelline on December 22, 1936.

Junction list

See also
Midway Drive-In (Texas)

References

086
Transportation in Parmer County, Texas
Transportation in Castro County, Texas
Transportation in Swisher County, Texas
Transportation in Briscoe County, Texas
Transportation in Hall County, Texas